Chipper may refer to:

People
 Chipper (nickname)
 Eric Chipper (1915–1996), Canadian football player
 John Chipper (1910–1980), British politician
 Chipper Jones (born 1972), American baseball player

Arts, entertainment, and media
 Chipper the chipmunk, a Beanie Baby
 Chipper, a children's book by James Lincoln Collier

Other uses
 Chipper (dog), a dog in the RCA family
 Chipper (drugs), an occasional tobacco smoker or drug user
 Tree chipper or wood chipper, a machine used for reducing wood into smaller parts
 USS Chipper, the name of more than one United States Navy ship
 Chipper (golf), a type of golf club
 A fish and chip shop in Hiberno-English
 A nickname for Chocolate-covered potato chips

See also 
 Chip (disambiguation)
 Chipping (disambiguation)
 Crisp (disambiguation)